Dunk Yer Funk Records was a sub-label of record distributor JDC Records,  active in San Pedro, California from 1985 to 1988.  With the growing popularity of rap music and electrofunk, Jim Callon decided to form a sub-label.  This would keep his JDC Records music catalog focused on dance music and Dunk Yer Funk on rap.  The logo of the music label was a 12-inch vinyl record being dipped into a cup of coffee.

Dunk Yer Funk featured important artists such as Uncle Jamms Army, The Unknown DJ and Doug Wimbish. Other less known artists were released on the label, but one in specific would become a classic; "Velocity, Speed and Force" by VSF (which was produced by J-vibe). It sold less than 3000 copies when it was originally released and the remaining stock was recycled. More than a decade later, its classic status and rarity drove the value around $100–$200 per copy and vinyl record collectors continue to search for it.

Releases
 DYF-002  Various L.A. Beats (12")
 DYF-003  Doug Wimbish & Fats Comet - Don't Forget That Beat (12")
 DYF-004  Orbit (Re-oRbiT)* (featuring Carol Hall) - The Beat Goes On (12")
 DYF-005  Toddy Tee - Just Say No (12")
 DYF-007  Uncle Jam's Army - Dial-a-Freak (10 Minute Remix) (12")
 DYF-008  Toddy Tee - Gangster Boogie (12")
 DYF-009  DJ Slice & Kool Rock Jay - Slice It Up (12")
 DYF-010  The Boo-Yow Boyz - We Came to Rock (12")
 DYF-011  DJ Matrix - Feel My Bass (12")
 DYF-012  VSF - Velocity, Speed And Force (12")
 DYF-013  Late Night Magic - Scream Baybee / Lost in Bass (12")
 DYF-014  Renegade MC - Wabbit (The Roger Dance) (12")
 DYF-015  Impakt - Defcon (12"). Defcon was a song written, arranged, produced, mixed, and performed by Impakt for Big City Records and released in 1986. The early Hip Hop track is now considered part of the Electro lexicon. Defcon was recorded at Son. Song Studios and published by Magic Mix Music Publ. (BMI). The track was engineered by T-Bone and performed by Impakt: Dino Esposito, Frankie Anobile, and Rob Hatchcock.
 DYF-016  Unknown D.J. -  The Basstronic (12")

External links

References

American record labels
Hip hop record labels
Record labels based in California
Record labels established in 1985
Companies based in Los Angeles
1985 establishments in California